Callipterinella is a genus of true bugs belonging to the family Aphididae. The species of this genus are found in Europe and North America.

Species
The following species are recognised in the genus Callipterinella:
 Callipterinella calliptera (Hartig, 1841)
 Callipterinella minutissima (Stroyan, 1953)
 Callipterinella tuberculata (Heyden, 1837)

References

Aphididae